Count Baltar is a leading antagonist in the original Battlestar Galactica (1978) television series. The character betrays the human race to its enemy, the robot race of Cylons. He was portrayed by Canadian actor John Colicos.

Character biography

History
Deleted material from the final broadcast of the series explains that Baltar had originally been a Colonial military officer, who led an expedition to discover new sources of tylium for mining. After discovering a particularly rich tylium deposit on Carillon, Baltar decides to go into business for himself, leaving the military and declaring Carillon too minimal for mining; Baltar mines the planet himself alongside the Cylons and Ovions.

Traitor
Towards the last years of the Thousand Year War between the Cylons and the Twelve Colonies of Man, Council-of-Twelve member Baltar acts as a liaison between the Twelve Colonies and the Cylons, and arranges for a peace conference that will bring an end to the war, with the Cylons conceding defeat. This is a ruse, Baltar makes a deal with the Imperious Leader of the Cylons: Baltar will conduct the peace conference to distract the Colonials while the Cylons orchestrate a massive attack on the Colonial military and the Twelve Colonies. In return, the Imperious Leader promises Baltar that his home colony will be spared and Baltar will be installed as its dictator. The Imperious Leader goes back on his word, and destroys all twelve Colonies in the attack.

After the attack
A small number of humans flee in civilian ships, under the protection of the sole surviving Battlestar, the Galactica. Baltar confronts the Imperious Leader aboard his flagship, enraged that the Cylons have not held up their end of the bargain. The Imperious Leader sentences Baltar to death. In the original theatrical version, Baltar is decapitated by a Cylon. In television screening, the scene was reshot to the Imperious Leader ordering Baltar be taken away for public execution. Shortly after the Imperious Leader is destroyed when the planet Carillon explodes.

Pursuer of the Galactica and its ragtag fleet
The second Imperious Leader (both played by Dick Durock and voiced by Patrick Macnee) spares Baltar's life, believing that Baltar, being human, would have a superior insight into the minds of the remnants of humanity which the Cylons are pursuing. The Imperious Leader installs Baltar as the commander of a Cylon basestar, with an "IL-series" Cylon named Lucifer (body by Felix Silla, voice by Jonathan Harris) as Baltar's second in command. Baltar makes it his personal quest to vanquish his rival, Commander Adama, and destroy the Galactica and its fleet.

Freedom
In the final episode of the series, "The Hand of God", Baltar makes a deal with Adama. Baltar provides the Colonials with technical information on Cylon basestars, which Apollo and Starbuck use to render a wayward Cylon basestar "blind" to the Galactica, which then destroys it. In exchange, Adama agrees to maroon Baltar with sufficient equipment and supplies to allow him to live on the first habitable planet that the Fleet passes on its journey; Adama also reluctantly gives Baltar equipment for "short-range communications" so that he has "some hope of eventual rescue".

Revival attempt
In 1999, John Colicos reprised his role as Baltar for Richard Hatch's attempt to revive the series. In a short film entitled Battlestar Galactica: The Second Coming, he reveals that the Colonial fleet is still in danger after a new breed of even more dangerous Cylons emerges after a civil war.

Differences in other versions

In the novelization
In the original telefilm novelization Baltar is a rare items dealer who has grown wealthy from his business dealings, and whose title of Count is self proclaimed. Later novelizations of subsequent episodes revealed that Baltar's resentment of Adama had started when they had attended the Colonial Academy together, with Adama besting him in everything.

In comics
In the Marvel Comics run from 1978–80, Baltar was executed by the Cylons as seen in the treasury sized edition.

In the 1990s, Baltar appears in the Maximum Press comic book series, still pursuing the Galactica, after having been freed by Commander Adama in exchange for bartering his knowledge of the Cylons. 

Dynamite Comics expands on this concept in a 2014 story in which Baltar is found on the planet abandoned by Adama in "The Hand of God". He remembers his life to this point and how he felt betrayed by the Colonies and thus sided with the Cylon empire, only to be betrayed himself by the Cylons and suddenly believes he himself has been transmuted by the Cylons into a cybernetic being; throughout the story he deals with one particular Centurion, as a youth, before the massacre of the Colonies.

In the re-imagined 2003 version

In the 2003 miniseries and 2004 series, the character is reimagined as Gaius Baltar, a scientist who is seduced and tricked by a human-looking Cylon into sabotaging the Colonial security systems, allowing them to attack the Colonies. He successfully covers up his role in the attacks, and using his reputation as a scientific genius, positions himself as part of the leadership of the survivors, serving as vice president, president, a puppet dictator under a Cylon occupation force, and a refugee aboard a Cylon ship following that administration's collapse. He is mentally unstable, a condition which is exacerbated by his interactions with a manifestation of his Cylon lover which only he perceives.

See also
 Gaius Baltar

References

External links 
 Baltar at Battlestar Wiki

Battlestar Galactica (1978) characters
Fictional counts and countesses
Fictional double agents
Fictional mass murderers
Television characters introduced in 1978